Typhlodromalus is a genus of mites in the Phytoseiidae family.

Species

 Typhlodromalus aequidens (Blommers, 1974)
 Typhlodromalus arawak De Leon, 1966
 Typhlodromalus aripo De Leon, 1967
 Typhlodromalus athiasae (Pritchard & Baker, 1962)
 Typhlodromalus breviscutus Moraes, Oliveira & Zannou, 2001
 Typhlodromalus chikmagalurensis (Gupta, 1986)
 Typhlodromalus chitradurgae (Gupta, 1986)
 Typhlodromalus clavicus Denmark & Muma, 1973
 Typhlodromalus congeae (De Leon, 1965)
 Typhlodromalus distinctus (Denmark & Matthysse, 1981)
 Typhlodromalus endiandrae (Schicha, 1993)
 Typhlodromalus eucalypticus Gupta, 1978
 Typhlodromalus eujeniae (Gupta, 1977)
 Typhlodromalus ezoensis (Ehara, 1967)
 Typhlodromalus feresi Lofego, Moraes & McMurtry, 2000
 Typhlodromalus fragosoi (Yoshida-Shaul & Chant, 1991)
 Typhlodromalus guajavae (Gupta, 1978)
 Typhlodromalus havu (Pritchard & Baker, 1962)
 Typhlodromalus higuilloae Denmark & Muma, 1975
 Typhlodromalus hova (Blommers, 1976)
 Typhlodromalus huapingensis (Wu & Li, 1985)
 Typhlodromalus hum (Pritchard & Baker, 1962)
 Typhlodromalus jarooa (Gupta, 1977)
 Typhlodromalus jucundus (Chant, 1959)
 Typhlodromalus julus Denmark & Evans, in Denmark, Evans, Aguilar, Vargas & Ochoa 1999
 Typhlodromalus laaensis (Gupta, 1986)
 Typhlodromalus laetus (Chant & Baker, 1965)
 Typhlodromalus lailae (Schicha, 1979)
 Typhlodromalus limonicus (Garman & McGregor, 1956)
 Typhlodromalus lunatus Denmark & Evans, in Denmark, Evans, Aguilar, Vargas & Ochoa 1999
 Typhlodromalus macrosetosus (van der Merwe, 1965)
 Typhlodromalus manihoti (Moraes, 1994)
 Typhlodromalus manipurensis (Gupta, 1978)
 Typhlodromalus marmoreus (El-Banhawy, 1978)
 Typhlodromalus munsteriensis (van der Merwe, 1965)
 Typhlodromalus ntandu (Pritchard & Baker, 1962)
 Typhlodromalus olombo (Pritchard & Baker, 1962)
 Typhlodromalus peregrinus (Muma, 1955)
 Typhlodromalus planetarius (De Leon, 1959)
 Typhlodromalus propitius (Chant & Baker, 1965)
 Typhlodromalus rhusi (van der Merwe, 1965)
 Typhlodromalus rosayroi Denmark & Muma, 1978
 Typhlodromalus rosica (Gupta, 1992)
 Typhlodromalus saltus (Denmark & Matthysse, 1981)
 Typhlodromalus serengati (El-Banhawy & Abou-Awad, 1990)
 Typhlodromalus sexta (Garman, 1958)
 Typhlodromalus simus Denmark & Muma, 1973
 Typhlodromalus sorghumae (Gupta, 1977)
 Typhlodromalus spinosus (Meyer & Rodrigues, 1966)
 Typhlodromalus swaga (Pritchard & Baker, 1962)
 Typhlodromalus tasaformis (Schicha & Corpuz-Raros, 1992)
 Typhlodromalus tenuiscutus McMurtry & Moraes, 1989
 Typhlodromalus terminatus (Chant & Baker, 1965)
 Typhlodromalus tigrus Denmark & Evans, in Denmark, Evans, Aguilar, Vargas & Ochoa 1999
 Typhlodromalus ultimus (Chant & Baker, 1965)
 Typhlodromalus villacarmelensis (Moraes), 1994)
 Typhlodromalus yunquensis (De Leon, 1965)

References

Phytoseiidae